Macroperipatus insularis is a species of velvet worm in the Peripatidae family. It may be found in Jamaica, Hispaniola, or Haiti. The original description of this species is based on a female specimen, 55 mm long, with 30 pairs of legs.

Conservation 

Macroperipatus insularis is listed as Endangered on the IUCN Red List.

References 

Endemic fauna of Jamaica
Fauna of Jamaica
IUCN-assessed onychophorans
Onychophorans of tropical America
Onychophoran species
Taxonomy articles created by Polbot